Georg Marinus Kruse (12 September 1894 – 23 May 1931) was a Danish boxer who competed in the 1920 Summer Olympics. Fighting in the middleweight class, he was eliminated in the second round with a loss to Marcel Rey-Golliet.

He was born in Copenhagen and died in Roskilde.

References

External links

1894 births
1931 deaths
Sportspeople from Copenhagen
Middleweight boxers
Olympic boxers of Denmark
Boxers at the 1920 Summer Olympics
Danish male boxers